Farzana Parveen Iqbal was killed on 27 May 2014 outside a court in Lahore, Punjab, Pakistan. Her father, two brothers and former fiancé were among the nearly twenty attackers. Farzana, who had eloped with a man of her own choice, and was pregnant by him, was killed in the tradition of honour killing.

Incident
Muhammad Iqbal and Farzana had been secretly engaged for many years. When she became pregnant, they decided to marry. By this time, Farzana's family had betrothed her to a man they considered worthy and suitable. When Farzana revealed her love affair (but apparently not her pregnancy) to her parents, they were shocked. However, they agreed to meet Muhammad Iqbal. At the meeting, Farzana's father, Muhammad Parveen, indicated that he would consent to the wedding on condition that Iqbal settle a large amount of money in Farzana's name as Mehr (which is an integral part of any Muslim wedding ceremony). The money would ensure that Farzana would have a back-up in case the marriage fell apart later. Iqbal said he could not afford so much, and suggested a much smaller Mehr. Iqbal alleges that Farzana's father initially agreed to the smaller sum, but later changed his mind and insisted again on the larger sum of money, after getting to know more about Iqbal's background and circumstances. According to Iqbal, Farzana's father withdrew support for the marriage after Iqbal refused his demands for more money, beyond the originally agreed Mehr. The lovers were determined to marry, and Farzana's pregnancy meant that they had no time to waste, so they eloped and got married without informing anyone. Since Farzana suddenly disappeared from her parents' house one day, the family informed the police and, on the advise of lawyers, filed a Habeas corpus petition in court. The runaway couple were quickly located by the police and duly produced in court.

On 27 May 2014, Farzana Iqbal, 30, was attacked by about a dozen male family members in front of a Pakistani High Court. The attackers were led by her father, Muhammad Parveen, and included her two brothers and other family members. They began by punching and kicking, then it escalated to using clubs and bricks, then hurling stones. She was killed for eloping and marrying Muhammad Iqbal, 45, whom she loved and by whom she was pregnant. Farzana Iqbal was pronounced dead at a local hospital.

Twelve people were arrested in connection with Iqbal's death, including her father, Muhammad Parveen. Police investigator Mujahid quoted him as saying: "I killed my daughter as she had dishonoured all of our family by marrying without our consent, and I have no regret over it." In November 2014, four members of Farzana's family were convicted of murder and sentenced to death.

See also
 Honour killing in Pakistan
 2012 Kohistan video case
 Qandeel Baloch
 Samia Sarwar
 Death of Samia Shahid
 Ayman Udas

References

2014 in Punjab, Pakistan
2014 murders in Pakistan
2010s crimes in Lahore 
Deaths by stoning
Female murder victims
Filicides 
Honor killing victims
Honour killing in Pakistan
Incidents of violence against women
May 2014 crimes in Asia 
Murder in Lahore
Pakistani murder victims
Sororicides